Koyaga is a genus of moths of the family Noctuidae. The genus was described by Ueda in 1984.

Selected species
Koyaga falsa (Butler, 1885)
Koyaga numisma (Staudinger, 1888)
Koyaga senex (Butler, 1881)
Koyaga virescens (Sugi, 1958)
Koyaga viriditincta (Wileman, 1915)

Citations

General references

Acontiinae